Wiang Chiang Khong is a small town (thesaban tambon) on the Mekong River in the northeast of Chiang Rai Province, Thailand, the central town of Chiang Khong District. It is the northernmost border crossing of the country into Laos  (with Houayxay on the opposite shore of the Mekong).  the town had a population of 4,342 and covers an area of 1.80 km2.

Photo gallery 

Populated places in Chiang Rai province
Laos–Thailand border crossings